Butyl ester may refer to:

 Butyl nitrite
 The family of organic chemical compounds containing an ester group and a butyl group including:
 Butyl acetate
 Butyl acrylate
 Butyl butyrate
 Butyl cyanoacrylate
 Butyl methacrylate
 Dibutyl phthalate

External links

Butyl compounds